The PFL 3 mixed martial arts event for the 2022 season of the Professional Fighters League was held on May 6, 2022, at the Esports Stadium Arlington in Arlington, Texas. This will be the third regular season event of the tournament and included fights in the Women's Lightweight and Welterweight divisions.

Background 
The event will be headlined by a women's lightweight clash between the 2019 and 2021 champion Kayla Harrison and Bellator vet Marina Mokhnatkina. The co-main will feature a welterweight bout between 2019 and 2021 champion Ray Cooper III facing undefeated Magomed Umalatov. Umalatov would pull out of the bout and be replaced by former LFA Welterweight Champion Carlos Leal.

The remaining two fights of the main card will see lightweight bout between ex-UFC champ Anthony Pettis facing Bellator veteran Myles Price, while former Bellator Welterweight champion Rory MacDonald faces off against Bellator and ACA vet Brett Cooper.

A welterweight bout between Magomed Magomedkerimov and João Zeferino was scheduled for this event, however Magomedkerimov pulled out of the bout due to visa issues and was replaced by Dilano Taylor.

At weigh-ins, Ray Cooper III and Genah Fabian missed weight for their bouts. Cooper weighed in at 176.4 pounds, 5.4 pounds over the welterweight non-title fight limit. Fabian weighed in at 160.8 pounds, 4.8 pounds over the lightweight non-title fight limit. They were fined 20 percent of their purses, ineligible to win playoff points, given a walkover loss, and were penalized one point in the standings. Carlos Leal and Julia Budd received walkover wins regardless of bout outcome but are eligible to gain stoppage points.

Results

Standings After Event 
The PFL points system is based on results of the match.  The winner of a fight receives 3 points.  If the fight ends in a draw, both fighters will receive 1 point. The bonus for winning a fight in the first, second, or third round is 3 points, 2 points, and 1 point respectively. The bonus for winning in the third round requires a fight be stopped before 4:59 of the third round.  No bonus point will be awarded if a fighter wins via decision.  For example, if a fighter wins a fight in the first round, then the fighter will receive 6 total points. A decision win will result in three total points.  If a fighter misses weight, the opponent (should they comply with weight limits) will receive 3 points due to a walkover victory, regardless of winning or losing the bout;  if the non-offending fighter subsequently wins with a stoppage, all bonus points will be awarded.

Welterweight

Women's Lightweight

Lightweight

See also 

 List of PFL events
 List of current PFL fighters

References 

Professional Fighters League
2022 in mixed martial arts
May 2022 sports events in the United States
Events in Arlington, Texas